RTS1 (Serbian Cyrillic: РТС1; First program of RTS (/), First channel of RTS (/ ) or only First (/ )) is a Serbian public mainstream TV channel operated by RTS.

Previously on RTS1

Serbian TV series
Јесен стиже, Дуњо моја (Goose Feather)
Оно као љубав (Something Like Love) - sitcom
Мој ујак (My Uncle) – children TV series
Стижу долари (Dollars are Coming)
Позориште у кући (Theater in the House)
Казнени простор (Criminal Space)
Лисице (Foxes)
Бољи живот (Better Life)
Срећни људи (Happy People)
Врућ ветар (Hot Wind)

Foreign TV series
My Name Is Earl (Зовем се Ерл)
CSI: Crime Scene Investigation (Место злочина)
CSI: NY (Место злочина: Њујорк)
CSI: Miami (Истражитељи из Мајамија)
Prison Break (Бекство из затвора)
Criminal Minds (Злочиначки умови)
How I Met Your Mother (Како сам упознао вашу маму)
Torchwood (Торчвуд)
Primeval (Посетиоци из праискона)
Hotel Babylon (Хотел Вавилон)
Rome (Рим)
The District (Дистрикт)
Boston Legal (Бостонски адвокати)
Monk (Монк)
Scrubs (Стажисти)
House (Др Хаус)
Eureka (Еурека)
The X-Files (Досије Икс)
Hustle (Преваранти)
Law & Order: Special Victims Unit (Ред и закон: Посебне жртве)
Law & Order: Criminal Intent (Ред и закон: Злочиначке намере)
ER (Ургентни центар)
Silent Witness (Тихи сведок)

See also
RTS2
RTS3
RTS

References

External links

Television stations in Serbia
Television channels in North Macedonia
Radio Television of Serbia
Television channels and stations established in 1958
1958 establishments in Yugoslavia